Constantin may refer to:
Constantin, human name that may be either a surname or given name
Constantin Film, film company

See also
Constantine (disambiguation)